French Fried Vacation is a cult French comedy film directed by Patrice Leconte. The film satirizes life resorts such as Club Med. It is one of many films by the French comedy group Le Splendid. Josiane Balasko, Michel Blanc, Marie-Anne Chazel, Gérard Jugnot, Thierry Lhermitte and Christian Clavier wrote and created together the play "Amours, Coquillages et Crustacés", and drew the scenario for Les Bronzés from this café-théâtre piece. The film has achieved cult status in France, where it sold 2.2 million tickets during its initial theatrical release.

It was followed by two sequels, also directed by Patrice Leconte: Les Bronzés font du ski (1979) and Les Bronzés 3: Amis pour la vie (2006).

Plot 
Gigi, Jerome, Christiane, Jean-Claude, and Bernard visit a resort in the Ivory Coast, the Club Med village of Assinie. Bernard subsequently meets up with his wife, Nathalie, who has already spent a week there, and they are all welcomed by Popeye and the eccentric emcees, Bobo and Bourseault. The film follows the humorous couplings and uncouplings of the group, and especially Popeye's attempt to seduce record numbers of women and, in stark contrast, Jean-Claude's failure to seduce even one.

Cast
 Josiane Balasko as Nathalie Morin
 Gérard Jugnot as Bernard Morin
 Marie-Anne Chazel as Gigi
 Christian Clavier as Docteur Jerome Tarere
 Michel Blanc as Jean-Claude Dusse
 Thierry Lhermitte as Popeye
 Luis Rego as Bobo
 Martin Lamotte as Miguel
 Dominique Lavanant as Christiane
 Bruno Moynot as Gilbert Sellman
 Michel Creton as Bourseault
 Guy Laporte as Marcus
 Pascale Deneu
 Marion Lanez
 Sylvie Obry

Filming location
Although the film depicts the adventures of a group of GOs and GMs at Club Med, the shooting was made mostly at Valtur village Les Paletuviers, next to the Club Med resort.

References

External links
 
 

1970s French-language films
1978 films
Films directed by Patrice Leconte
French comedy films
Films about vacationing
1978 comedy films
1970s French films